USA-298, also known as Advanced Extremely High Frequency 6 or AEHF-6, is a military communications satellite operated by the United States Space Force (USSF). It is the sixth of six satellite to be launched as part of the Advanced Extremely High Frequency program, which replaced the earlier Milstar system.

Satellite description 
The USA-298 satellite was constructed by Lockheed Martin Space, and is based on the A2100 satellite bus. It will be used to provide super high frequency (SHF) and extremely high frequency (EHF) communications for the United States Armed Forces, as well as those of the United Kingdom, the Netherlands, Canada, and Australia.

Launch 
USA-298 was launched by United Launch Alliance, aboard an Atlas V 551 flying from SLC-41 at the Cape Canaveral Air Force Station (CCAFS). The satellite was successfully deployed in this orbit about five and a half hours after launch.

TDO-2  satellite 
Alongside AEHF-6, the U.S. Air Force Space and Missile Systems Center launched an experimental 12U cubesat known as TDO-2 (Technology Demonstration Orbiter).

See also 

 2020 in spaceflight

References 

USA satellites
Spacecraft launched in 2020
Spacecraft launched by Atlas rockets